Bronson Beri (born 26 June 1989) is a New Zealand basketball player.

Beri was born and raised in Timaru, where he attended Roncalli College. He moved to Nelson in 2007 to attend Nelson College.

Beri made his debut for the Nelson Giants in the National Basketball League (NBL) in 2007 and was a member of the Giants' championship-winning squad that year. Six seasons waiting for his time, he was having a career-best year in 2012 before suffering a serious knee injury, damaging both the anterior cruciate ligament and the medial collateral ligament. He returned to the Giants in 2014 after rehabbing his knee for almost two years. He continued on with the Giants ever year between 2015 and 2019. He missed the 2020 season due to work commitments, but returned to the Giants in 2021.

References

External links
NBL stats

1989 births
Living people
Nelson Giants players
New Zealand men's basketball players
People educated at Nelson College
People educated at Roncalli College
Power forwards (basketball)
Sportspeople from Timaru